Horze is a privately owned, initially Finnish equestrian products and supplies retailer. It is one of the biggest European equestrian retailers, having stores in all Scandinavian countries, Germany, France, Hungary, Malaysia and Russia. Horze also runs e-commerce for all countries in the European Union.

History

The Horze riding brand was launched in October 2003 by Oy Finn-Tack Ltd., originally a wholesale supplier of trotting equipment since 1982. In 2004 it opened its first concept stores in St. Petersburg and Lahti, followed by Oslo, Stockholm and Copenhagen. Since then, franchise stores have been added across Europe. The Horze brand also has wholesale distribution in many countries, including Spain, France, UK, Ireland, Greece, Turkey, New Zealand, Australia, Dubai, Poland, Ukraine, Russia, The Netherlands, Hungary and Latvia.

Sponsorship

Horze sponsors both the Finnish and Norwegian international equestrian teams. They also sponsor 24 individual riders from a variety of disciplines and countries in Europe, making up Team Horze. Heading up the team is Danish Show jumping champion, Tina Lund.

Countries in which Horze operates

References

External links
Horze corporate page

Finnish brands
Retail companies of Finland